Willie Clark (27 September 1918 – 28 December 2008) was a Scottish footballer, who played in the Scottish Football League for Hibernian and St Johnstone.

His football career was interrupted by the Second World War, during which he served in the Royal Air Force.

References

External links

1918 births
2008 deaths
People from Cockenzie and Port Seton
Scottish footballers
Association football fullbacks
Scottish Football League players
Bonnyrigg Rose Athletic F.C. players
Hibernian F.C. players
St Johnstone F.C. players
Royal Air Force personnel of World War II